The 14th Critics' Choice Awards were presented on January 8, 2009, at the Santa Monica Civic Auditorium, honoring the finest achievements of 2008 filmmaking. The nominees were announced on December 9, 2008.

Winners and nominees

Best Picture Made for Television
John Adams
Coco Chanel
Recount

Joel Siegel Award
Richard Gere

Statistics

References

External links
Critics’ Choice Movie Awards Winners (Archive) for 14th-19th Awards

Broadcast Film Critics Association Awards
2008 film awards